

51st Street is a  long one-way street traveling east to west across Midtown Manhattan.

Notable places, east to west
The route officially begins at Beekman Place which is on a hill overlooking FDR Drive. 51st continues for a few feet east of the intersection but the street sign refers to it as Peter Detmold Park (a reference to the dog park at the bottom of the hill) which has a pedestrian walk way over the FDR to the East River.

Beekman Place
Yemen Mission to the United Nations

First Avenue
351 East 51st Street - An apartment complex on one of several sites where Nathan Hale is believed to have been hanged, after the Battle of Long Island
Laos Mission to the United Nations

Second Avenue

Tonga Mission to the United Nations
Equatorial Guinea Mission to the United Nations
POD Hotel
Greenacre Park
Sutton Place Synagogue

Third Avenue
17th Precinct of NYPD
Engine Company No 8, Ladder 2, 8th Battalion of FDNY
DoubleTree by Hilton Hotel Metropolitan New York City
Great Britain Consulate

Lexington Avenue
General Electric Building
St. Bartholomew's Episcopal Church
345 Park Avenue

Park Avenue
350 Park Avenue
320 Park Avenue
Villard Houses and The New York Palace Hotel

Madison Avenue
St. Patrick's Cathedral
488 Madison Avenue (Look Building)
John Peirce Residence
Venezuela Consulate
Olympic Tower

Fifth Avenue
Rockefeller Center
Radio City Music Hall
1290 Avenue of the Americas

Sixth Avenue
Time-Life Building
SportsNet New York Studios
1285 Avenue of the Americas
787 Seventh Avenue
 Millennium Plaza (former Taft Hotel)

Sixth and a Half Avenue
 In the middle of block between Sixth and Seventh Avenues is a pedestrian corridor named by the city "Sixth and a Half Avenue", which runs from 51st to 57th Streets.

Seventh Avenue
Sheraton Manhattan

Broadway 
Novotel Manhattan
Paramount Plaza
Mark Hellinger Theatre
Times Square Church
George Gershwin Theatre

Eighth Avenue 
St. Paul's House - Church founded by J.J.D. Hall that is noted for its "Sin Will Find You Out" neon sign in the shape of a cross that was featured on Saturday Night Live

Ninth Avenue
Closed Midtown Branch of Saint Vincent's Catholic Medical Center (formerly St. Clares Hospital)

Eleventh Avenue
Hustler Club

West Side Highway
The route concludes at the West Side Highway (New York Route 9A). Opposite the intersection is the New York Passenger Ship Terminal and the Hudson River.

Transportation

Another entrance on the intersection leading to the downtown platforms of the station existed until 1992, when it was closed.

References
Notes

External links

Emporis West 51st profile
51st Street: A New York Songline - virtual walking tour

051
Midtown Manhattan